The 1988–89 NBA season was the Bullets' 28th season in the NBA. During the off-season, the team acquired Dave Feitl from the Golden State Warriors. Under Wes Unseld's first full season as head coach, and with the addition of rookies, first round draft pick Harvey Grant, and second round draft pick Ledell Eackles from the 1988 NBA draft, the Bullets struggled losing seven straight games in December, which led to a 4–14 start, and held a 17–28 record at the All-Star break. However, the team played above .500 for the remainder of the season, and finished fourth in the Atlantic Division with a 40–42 record, which was two more wins then the previous season, but the team failed to qualify for the playoffs, finishing just two games behind the 8th-seeded Boston Celtics. 

Jeff Malone led the team in scoring averaging 21.7 points per game, while Bernard King averaged 20.7 points per game, and sixth man Hot Plate Williams provided the team with 13.7 points, 7.0 rebounds, 4.3 assists and 1.7 steals per game off the bench, and finished in fourth place in Sixth Man of the Year voting. In addition, Eackles contributed 11.5 points per game off the bench, while Terry Catledge provided with 10.4 points and 7.2 rebounds per game, Darrell Walker contributed 9.0 points, 6.4 rebounds, 6.3 assists and 2.0 steals per game, and starting center Charles Jones averaged 2.6 points, 4.8 rebounds and 1.4 blocks per game, but only played 53 games due to a knee injury. Unseld finished in fifth place in Coach of the Year voting.

Following the season, Catledge left in the 1989 NBA Expansion Draft, and Feitl was released to free agency.

Draft picks

Roster

Regular season

Season standings

z - clinched division title
y - clinched division title
x - clinched playoff spot

Record vs. opponents

Game log

Regular season

|- align="center" bgcolor="#ffcccc"
| 1
| November 5
| Chicago
| L 98–111
|
|
|
| Capital Centre
| 0–1
|- align="center" bgcolor="#ffcccc"
| 2
| November 8
| @ New Jersey
| L 101–109
|
|
|
| Brendan Byrne Arena
| 0–2
|- align="center" bgcolor="#ffcccc"
| 3
| November 9
| New York
| L 110–117
|
|
|
| Capital Centre
| 0–3
|- align="center" bgcolor="#ccffcc"
| 4
| November 11
| Charlotte
| W 96–87
|
|
|
| Capital Centre
| 1–3
|- align="center" bgcolor="#ffcccc"
| 5
| November 12
| @ New York
| L 101–111
|
|
|
| Madison Square Garden
| 1–4
|- align="center" bgcolor="#ffcccc"
| 6
| November 18
| @ Boston
| L 108–114
|
|
|
| Boston Garden
| 1–5
|- align="center" bgcolor="#ccffcc"
| 7
| November 19
| Boston
| W 108–104
|
|
|
| Capital Centre
| 2–5
|- align="center" bgcolor="#ffcccc"
| 8
| November 22
| Philadelphia
| L 103–130
|
|
|
| Capital Centre
| 2–6
|- align="center" bgcolor="#ffcccc"
| 9
| November 23
| @ Milwaukee
| L 102–124
|
|
|
| Bradley Center
| 2–7
|- align="center" bgcolor="#ccffcc"
| 10
| November 25
| @ Indiana
| W 106–101
|
|
|
| Market Square Arena
| 3–7
|- align="center" bgcolor="#ccffcc"
| 11
| November 26
| @ Charlotte
| W 120–113
|
|
|
| Charlotte Coliseum
| 4–7

|- align="center" bgcolor="#ffcccc"
| 12
| December 1
| @ Atlanta
| L 115–127
|
|
|
| The Omni
| 4–8
|- align="center" bgcolor="#ffcccc"
| 13
| December 2
| Detroit
| L 114–120
|
|
|
| Capital Centre
| 4–9
|- align="center" bgcolor="#ffcccc"
| 14
| December 4
| @ L.A. Lakers
| L 112–119 (OT)
|
|
|
| The Forum
| 4–10
|- align="center" bgcolor="#ffcccc"
| 15
| December 6
| @ Phoenix
| L 92–130
|
|
|
| Arizona Veterans Memorial Coliseum
| 4–11
|- align="center" bgcolor="#ffcccc"
| 16
| December 7
| @ Utah
| L 94–111
|
|
|
| Salt Palace
| 4–12
|- align="center" bgcolor="#ffcccc"
| 17
| December 9
| @ Portland
| L 90–93
|
|
|
| Memorial Coliseum
| 4–13
|- align="center" bgcolor="#ffcccc"
| 18
| December 10
| @ Golden State
| L 102–109
|
|
|
| Oakland–Alameda County Coliseum Arena
| 4–14
|- align="center" bgcolor="#ccffcc"
| 19
| December 13
| Boston
| W 115–105
|
|
|
| Capital Centre
| 5–14
|- align="center" bgcolor="#ffcccc"
| 20
| December 17
| @ New York
| L 102–117
|
|
|
| Madison Square Garden
| 5–15
|- align="center" bgcolor="#ccffcc"
| 21
| December 18
| L.A. Lakers
| W 115–110
|
|
|
| Capital Centre
| 6–15
|- align="center" bgcolor="#ffcccc"
| 22
| December 21
| Utah
| L 82–98
|
|
|
| Capital Centre
| 6–16
|- align="center" bgcolor="#ffcccc"
| 23
| December 25
| @ Philadelphia
| L 110–125
|
|
|
| The Spectrum
| 6–17
|- align="center" bgcolor="#ccffcc"
| 24
| December 26
| @ New Jersey
| W 120–108
|
|
|
| Brendan Byrne Arena
| 7–17
|- align="center" bgcolor="#ccffcc"
| 25
| December 29
| Houston
| W 126–109
|
|
|
| Capital Centre
| 8–17
|- align="center" bgcolor="#ffcccc"
| 26
| December 30
| @ Cleveland
| L 110–127
|
|
|
| Richfield Coliseum
| 8–18

|- align="center" bgcolor="#ffcccc"
| 27
| January 2
| Phoenix
| L 122–125
|
|
|
| Capital Centre
| 8–19
|- align="center" bgcolor="#ccffcc"
| 28
| January 4
| Charlotte
| W 109–86
|
|
|
| Capital Centre
| 9–19
|- align="center" bgcolor="#ffcccc"
| 29
| January 6
| Milwaukee(at Baltimore, Maryland)
| L 121–128 (2OT)
|
|
|
| Baltimore Arena
| 9–20
|- align="center" bgcolor="#ffcccc"
| 30
| January 7
| @ Charlotte
| L 104–107
|
|
|
| Charlotte Coliseum
| 9–21
|- align="center" bgcolor="#ccffcc"
| 31
| January 10
| Denver
| W 120–117
|
|
|
| Capital Centre
| 10–21
|- align="center" bgcolor="#ccffcc"
| 32
| January 12
| Miami
| W 106–100
|
|
|
| Capital Centre
| 11–21
|- align="center" bgcolor="#ffcccc"
| 33
| January 13
| @ Detroit
| L 103–119
|
|
|
| The Palace of Auburn Hills
| 11–22
|- align="center" bgcolor="#ffcccc"
| 34
| January 16
| Atlanta
| L 106–117
|
|
|
| Capital Centre
| 11–23
|- align="center" bgcolor="#ccffcc"
| 35
| January 19
| San Antonio
| W 115–112
|
|
|
| Capital Centre
| 12–23
|- align="center" bgcolor="#ccffcc"
| 36
| January 21
| Philadelphia
| W 107–105
|
|
|
| Capital Centre
| 13–23
|- align="center" bgcolor="#ccffcc"
| 37
| January 26
| Indiana
| W 126–106
|
|
|
| Capital Centre
| 14–23
|- align="center" bgcolor="#ffcccc"
| 38
| January 27
| @ Chicago
| L 106–117
|
|
|
| Chicago Stadium
| 14–24
|- align="center" bgcolor="#ccffcc"
| 38
| January 29
| Cleveland(at Baltimore, Maryland)
| W 122–117 (OT)
|
|
|
| Baltimore Arena
| 15–24
|- align="center" bgcolor="#ccffcc"
| 40
| January 31
| Boston
| W 110–103
|
|
|
| Capital Centre
| 16–24

|- align="center" bgcolor="#ffcccc"
| 41
| February 1
| @ Philadelphia
| L 110–114 (OT)
|
|
|
| The Spectrum
| 16–25
|- align="center" bgcolor="#ffcccc"
| 42
| February 3
| @ Boston
| L 108–117
|
|
|
| Boston Garden
| 16–26
|- align="center" bgcolor="#ffcccc"
| 43
| February 4
| Milwaukee
| L 102–113
|
|
|
| Capital Centre
| 16–27
|- align="center" bgcolor="#ffcccc"
| 44
| February 7
| @ New York
| L 105–117
|
|
|
| Madison Square Garden
| 16–28
|- align="center" bgcolor="#ccffcc"
| 45
| February 9
| New Jersey
| W 110–103
|
|
|
| Capital Centre
| 17–28
|- align="center" bgcolor="#ccffcc"
| 46
| February 14
| @ Sacramento
| W 107–99
|
|
|
| ARCO Arena
| 18–28
|- align="center" bgcolor="#ffcccc"
| 45
| February 15
| @ Denver
| L 106–117
|
|
|
| Capital Centre
| 18–29
|- align="center" bgcolor="#ffcccc"
| 48
| February 17
| @ Seattle
| L 112–126
|
|
|
| Seattle Center Coliseum
| 18–30
|- align="center" bgcolor="#ccffcc"
| 49
| February 18
| @ L.A. Clippers
| W 98–93
|
|
|
| Los Angeles Memorial Sports Arena
| 19–30
|- align="center" bgcolor="#ccffcc"
| 50
| February 21
| L.A. Clippers
| W 123–109
|
|
|
| Capital Centre
| 20–30
|- align="center" bgcolor="#ccffcc"
| 51
| February 24
| New York(at Baltimore, Maryland)
| W 130–127
|
|
|
| Baltimore Arena
| 21–30
|- align="center" bgcolor="#ccffcc"
| 52
| February 25
| @ Dallas
| L 93–127
|
|
|
| Reunion Arena
| 21–31
|- align="center" bgcolor="#ccffcc"
| 53
| February 27
| @ Houston
| W 104–98
|
|
|
| Capital Centre
| 22–31

|- align="center" bgcolor="#ccffcc"
| 54
| March 1
| New Jersey
| W 120–105
|
|
|
| Capital Centre
| 23–31
|- align="center" bgcolor="#ccffcc"
| 55
| March 4
| Dallas
| W 119–105
|
|
|
| Capital Centre
| 24–31
|- align="center" bgcolor="#ccffcc"
| 56
| March 5
| Charlotte
| W 114–101
|
|
|
| Capital Centre
| 25–31
|- align="center" bgcolor="#ffcccc"
| 57
| March 7
| @ Milwaukee
| L 101–121
|
|
|
| Bradley Center
| 25–32
|- align="center" bgcolor="#ffcccc"
| 58
| March 8
| Atlanta
| W 119–111
|
|
|
| Capital Centre
| 26–32
|- align="center" bgcolor="#ccffcc"
| 59
| March 10
| Sacramento
| W 114–97
|
|
|
| Capital Centre
| 27–32
|- align="center" bgcolor="#ffcccc"
| 60
| March 12
| @ Detroit
| L 104–110
|
|
|
| The Palace of Auburn Hills
| 27–33
|- align="center" bgcolor="#ccffcc"
| 61
| March 13
| Seattle
| W 106–101
|
|
|
| Capital Centre
| 28–33
|- align="center" bgcolor="#ccffcc"
| 62
| March 17
| @ New Jersey
| W 124–121 (OT)
|
|
|
| Brendan Byrne Arena
| 29–33
|- align="center" bgcolor="#ccffcc"
| 63
| March 18
| Philadelphia
| W 123–114
|
|
|
| Capital Centre
| 30–33
|- align="center" bgcolor="#ffcccc"
| 64
| March 20
| @ Cleveland
| L 97–103
|
|
|
| Richfield Coliseum
| 30–34
|- align="center" bgcolor="#ffcccc"
| 65
| March 22
| @ Indiana
| L 92–101
|
|
|
| Market Square Arena
| 30–35
|- align="center" bgcolor="#ccffcc"
| 66
| March 23
| @ Charlotte
| W 102–97
|
|
|
| Charlotte Coliseum
| 31–35
|- align="center" bgcolor="#ccffcc"
| 67
| March 25
| Indiana
| W 111–108 (OT)
|
|
|
| Capital Centre
| 32–35
|- align="center" bgcolor="#ffcccc"
| 68
| March 28
| @ San Antonio
| L 114–130
|
|
|
| HemisFair Arena
| 32–36
|- align="center" bgcolor="#ffcccc"
| 69
| March 29
| @ Atlanta
| L 102–120
|
|
|
| The Omni
| 32–37
|- align="center" bgcolor="#ccffcc"
| 70
| March 31
| Portland
| W 107–105
|
|
|
| Capital Centre
| 33–37

|- align="center" bgcolor="#ccffcc"
| 71
| April 2
| Golden State
| W 120–103
|
|
|
| Capital Centre
| 34–37
|- align="center" bgcolor="#ccffcc"
| 72
| April 4
| New Jersey
| W 104–96
|
|
|
| Capital Centre
| 35–37
|- align="center" bgcolor="#ccffcc"
| 73
| April 6
| @ Miami
| W 101–93
|
|
|
| Miami Arena
| 36–37
|- align="center" bgcolor="#ccffcc"
| 74
| April 7
| Cleveland
| W 107–96
|
|
|
| Capital Centre
| 37–37
|- align="center" bgcolor="#ffcccc"
| 75
| April 9
| New York
| L 92–94
|
|
|
| Capital Centre
| 37–38
|- align="center" bgcolor="#ffcccc"
| 76
| April 10
| Detroit
| L 100–124
|
|
|
| Capital Centre
| 37–39
|- align="center" bgcolor="#ffcccc"
| 78
| April 16
| @ Detroit
| L 98–104
|
|
|
| The Palace of Auburn Hills
| 38–40
|- align="center" bgcolor="#ccffcc"
| 79
| April 18
| @ Boston
| W 121–113
|
|
|
| Boston Garden
| 39–40
|- align="center" bgcolor="#ccffcc"
| 80
| April 20
| Chicago
| W 100–98
|
|
|
| Capital Centre
| 40–40
|- align="center" bgcolor="#ffcccc"
| 81
| April 21
| @ Chicago
| L 113–115
|
|
|
| Chicago Stadium
| 40–41
|- align="center" bgcolor="#ffcccc"
| 82
| April 23
| @ Philadelphia
| L 106–115
|
|
|
| The Spectrum
| 40–42

Player statistics

Season

References

See also
 1988-89 NBA season

Washington Wizards seasons
Wash
Washing
Washing